SS Rye was a freight vessel built for the Lancashire and Yorkshire Railway in 1914.

History

The ship was built by Clyde Shipbuilding Company Port Glasgow for the Lancashire and Yorkshire Railway and launched on 21 May 1914. She underwent trials in June 1914.

References

1914 ships
Steamships of the United Kingdom
Ships built on the River Clyde
Ships of the Lancashire and Yorkshire Railway
Maritime incidents in 1918
Ships sunk by German submarines in World War I
World War I shipwrecks in the English Channel